İstiklal is a historical neighborhood in the Seyhan district of the city of Adana. The neighborhood is part of the downtown, situated south of the D400 state road and east of the Adana Metro line.

İstiklal neighborhood developed west of the Adana's first Central train station that opened in 1886. Several factories, hotels and luxury mansions built rapidly around the station from 1880s to 1910s.

Governance
İstiklal is a mahalle and it is administered by the Muhtar and the Seniors Council.

Demographics
The population of Reşatbey as of December 31, 2014 is 7120. The neighborhood is mostly made up of Turkish residents.

Economy
İstiklal is a middle-class neighborhood. Once a manufacturing zone of Adana, the neighborhood was home to Turkey's first textile factories.

Transport
İstiklal station of the Adana Metro is steps away from the İstiklal neighborhood.

Şakirpaşa railway station is 2 km northwest of the neighborhood, one block north of the D400 State road.

Şakirpaşa Airport is 1 km west of the neighborhood at a walking distance.

References

Neighborhoods/Settlements in Adana